Polygala tenuifolia (yuǎn zhì) is an herb in the family Polygalaceae which is hardy to USDA Zone 6.

Phytochemistry
P. tenuifolia contains tenuifolin, senegenin, and polygalacic acid.

Medicinal uses
Yuan zhi is used primarily as an expectorant. It is one of the 50 fundamental herbs used in traditional Chinese medicine, where it is called yuǎn zhì.

References

tenuifolia
Plants used in traditional Chinese medicine